The 2022 North Dakota Attorney General election took place on November 8, 2022, to elect the Attorney General of North Dakota. Incumbent Republican Attorney General Wayne Stenehjem had announced before his death on January 28, 2022 that he was retiring, and was replaced by former United States Attorney for the District of North Dakota and former Lieutenant Governor Drew Wrigley, who is running for a full term in his own right.

Republican primary

Candidates

Declared
Drew Wrigley, incumbent attorney general, former United States Attorney for the District of North Dakota (2001–2009, 2019–2021) and former Lieutenant Governor of North Dakota (2010–2016)

Declined
Wade Webb, district judge

Democratic primary

Candidates

Declared
Timothy Lamb, lawyer

Endorsements

General election

Predictions

Endorsements

See also
North Dakota Attorney General

References

External links
Official campaign websites
Drew Wrigley (R) for Attorney General

Attorney General
North Dakota
North Dakota Attorney General elections